Bavari (also Romanized as Bāvarī) is a village in Kabgian Rural District, Kabgian District, Dana County, Kohgiluyeh and Boyer-Ahmad Province, Iran. At the 2006 census, its population was 63, in 13 families.

References 

Populated places in Dana County